William McEchron House is a historic home located at Glens Falls, Warren County, New York.  It was built in 1891 and is a -story, asymmetrical stone-and-frame residence that incorporates elements of Queen Anne and Romanesque Revival design.  The first story is built of rock-faced, random ashlar sandstone.  It features a pair of stone arches at the entrance and a massive stone arch at the porte cochere.

It was added to the National Register of Historic Places in 1984.

References

]

Houses on the National Register of Historic Places in New York (state)
Queen Anne architecture in New York (state)
Houses completed in 1891
Houses in Warren County, New York
National Register of Historic Places in Warren County, New York